Front Row is a Philippine television documentary show broadcast by GMA News TV and GMA Network. It premiered on GMA News TV on March 5, 2011. The show moved to GMA Network on February 10, 2014, on the network's Monday evening line up. The show concluded on GMA Network on March 9, 2020. The show returned to GMA News TV on July 27, 2020, on the network's Power Block line up. The show returned to GMA Network on January 4, 2021. The show concluded on March 8, 2021. It was replaced by Stories of Hope in its timeslot.

Production
In March 2020, production was halted due to the enhanced community quarantine in Luzon caused by the COVID-19 pandemic. The show resumed its programming on July 27, 2020.

Accolades

References

External links 
 
 
 

2011 Philippine television series debuts
2021 Philippine television series endings
Filipino-language television shows
GMA Network original programming
GMA Integrated News and Public Affairs shows
GMA News TV original programming
Philippine documentary television series
Television productions suspended due to the COVID-19 pandemic